The 70s is a British documentary television series about the 1970s. It was broadcast on BBC Two in four episodes and was presented by Dominic Sandbrook.

Episode 1: Get It On, 70–72 
Air date: 16 April 2012
During this time, homeownership increased and house prices rocketed. More people went abroad on holidays than in previous years. Tens of thousands of Ugandan Asians move to the UK, having been expelled by its dictator Idi Amin.  Coal miners caused major problems for the government of Prime Minister Edward Heath.

Episode 2: Doomwatch, 73–74 
Air date: 23 April 2012
During these years, the UK joined what is now the European Union and there were large increases in inflation and the oil price. The sexual revolution gathered pace and environmental awareness became more common.

Episode 3: Goodbye Great Britain, 75–77 
Air date: 30 April 2012
New laws against sex discrimination were introduced, giving women the same rights at work as men. Football hooliganism, the Queen's silver jubilee and punk rock were other features of these years.

Episode 4: The Winner Takes It All, 77–79 
Air date: 7 May 2012

Reception 
The first episode was watched by around 2.7 million people (an audience share of 10.3%).

Nigel Farndale of the Sunday Telegraph gave it four stars out of five, saying Sandbrook "knows his subject", with the series being entertaining as well as having "a big idea at the core" — that the decade inspired Thatcherism.

References

External links 

Television series set in the 1970s
2012 British television series debuts
2012 British television series endings
2010s British documentary television series
BBC high definition shows
English-language television shows
BBC television documentaries about history during the 20th Century